El Toboso is a town and municipality located in the Mancha Alta de Toledo comarca, province of Toledo, Castile-La Mancha, central Spain. According to the 2009 data, El Toboso has a total population of 2,219 inhabitants. The economy of the town is based on wine production and cattle, and sheep.

El Toboso is famous for appearing in the novel Don Quixote by the Spanish writer Miguel de Cervantes, as the town in which the fictional character Dulcinea lives. The town also appears in Graham Greene's tribute Monsignor Quixote, where the heroes are a priest (supposedly a descendant of Cervantes's character), and the recently deposed Communist mayor of the town in the post-Franco era.

Main sights
 The Catholic church of San Antonio Abad, built in the 15th century.
 The convent of Trinitarias Recoletas, from the 17th century.
 The Cervantine Museum.
 The Museum of Dulcinea
 The lake of La Nava.

References

Toboso